Robert James may refer to:
Robert James (actor) (1924–2004), Scottish actor
Robert James (businessman) (died 1983), American founder of Raymond James Financial
Robert James (defensive back) (born 1947), played in the National Football League, 1969–1974
Robert James (headmaster) (1905–1982), headmaster of St Paul's School and of Harrow School
Robert James (linebacker) (born 1983), drafted by the Atlanta Falcons, 2008
Robert James (physician) (1703–1776), English physician
Robert Brian James (died 1944), British Army officer
Robert G. James (born 1946), United States District Court judge
Robert Rhodes James (1933–1999), British historian and Conservative Member of Parliament
Robert S. James (1818–1850), father of the American outlaw Jesse James
Robert James (MP) for Berkshire

See also
Robbie James (1957–1998), Welsh international footballer
Rob James (disambiguation)
Bob James (disambiguation)
Bert James (disambiguation)